The Bay Line Railroad  is one of several short line railroad companies owned by Genesee & Wyoming Inc. It operates between Panama City, Florida, and Dothan, Alabama, including a branch from Grimes to Abbeville, Alabama, reached via trackage rights on CSX's Dothan Subdivision between Dothan and Grimes. The line interchanges with the Florida Gulf & Atlantic Railroad at Cottondale, Florida, and with the CSX Dothan Subdivision near Dothan, Alabama. It also interchanges with the Chattahoochee Bay Railroad in Dothan.

A wide variety of commodities is carried, including aggregates, brick, cement, chemicals, coal, food and feed products, forest products, metallic ores and minerals, steel, and scrap.

History

The company's main line between Panama City and Dothan was constructed in 1906–1908 by the Atlanta and St. Andrews Bay Railroad (ASAB). The Abbeville branch was constructed in 1887–1893 by the Alabama Midland Railway and came under the control of the Atlantic Coast Line Railroad in 1902. CSX Transportation, eventual successor to the ACL, sold the line to the Abbeville–Grimes Railway Company (AG) in 1989. This company was merged with the Bay Line Railroad on June 26, 1996.

The Stone Container Corporation had owned the ASAB since 1987. Effective January 1, 1994, it sold the assets of the railroad to Rail Management Corporation, which created the new Bay Line Railroad company to operate it. Genesee & Wyoming acquired all the assets of Rail Management on June 1, 2005, including the Bay Line Railroad.

Notes

References

External links 

 

Alabama railroads
Florida railroads
Railway companies established in 1994
Genesee & Wyoming